Tomatis is a surname. People with that name include:

 Alfred A. Tomatis, French otolaryngologist and inventor
 Caterina Gattai Tomatis, Italian ballerina
 Lorenzo Tomatis, Italian physician and experimental oncologist
 David Tomatis (b. 1962), Monegasque bobsledder

See also 
 Tomati, a surname